The Rajendra Prasad Pandey cabinet is the incumbent provincial government of Bagmati Province. It was formed after Rajendra Prasad Pandey was sworn in as Chief Minister on 27 October 2021. The cabinet was expanded to six members 11 November 2021, to 12 members on 14 December 2021 and 18 members on 25 December 2021.

Chief Minister & Cabinet Ministers

Current Arrangement

See also 

 Provincial governments of Nepal
 1st Bagmati Provincial Assembly

References

External links 

 Office of Chief Minister and Council of Ministers of Bagmati Province

Provincial cabinets of Nepal
2021 establishments in Nepal
Government of Bagmati Province
2023 disestablishments in Nepal